The Oakland Fire Department (OFD) provides fire protection and emergency medical services to the city of Oakland, California.

History

The Oakland Fire Department was initially started in the 1860s as a volunteer fire department and was officially formed on March 13, 1869, when its first fire station was built. In 1908 the department bought their first motorized fire engine and in the 1920s, the department became one of the first in the nation to hire African American firefighters.

In 1991, the OFD was faced with a major conflagration that killed 25 people and injured 150 others.  The Oakland firestorm of 1991 burned  in the Berkeley and Oakland Hills, destroying 3,354 single-family dwellings and 437 apartment and condominium units. The economic loss was estimated at $1.5 billion.

USAR Task Force 4 

The Oakland Fire Department is the sponsoring agency of Urban Search and Rescue California Task Force 4 (CA-TF4), one of eight FEMA Urban Search and Rescue Task Forces in the state of California and 28 nationally. The task forces, which is made up of personnel from 15 different agencies in the Bay Area, provides resources to locate, extricate, and provide immediate medical treatment to victims trapped in collapsed structures as well as other life saving operations.

Stations and apparatus
Below is a complete listing of all OFD Fire Station and Fire Company locations according to Division and Battalion.

Rank structure 

 Firefighter/Paramedic
 Engineer 
 Lieutenant 
 Captain
 Battalion Chief
 Assistant Chief
 Deputy Chief
 Fire Chief

References

External links

Map of Oakland fire stations
List of all Oakland fire apparatus

Fire departments in California
Ambulance services in the United States
Fire
Fire
1869 establishments in California
Government agencies established in 1869
Medical and health organizations based in California